Girish Bapat (born 3 September 1950) is an Indian politician and a Member of Parliament in the 17th Lok Sabha. He was elected to the Lok Sabha, lower house of the Parliament of India from Pune, Maharashtra in the 2019 Indian general election as member of Bharatiya Janata Party. Earlier he was the Cabinet Minister for Food, Civil Supplies and Consumer Protection, Food and Drugs Administration, Parliamentary Affairs in Government of Maharashtra. He was member of 13th Maharashtra Legislative Assembly and one of top Bharatiya Janata Party leaders in Vidhansabha. He was elected from  Kasba Peth Constituency to the Vidhan Sabha in five consecutive elections since 1995.

Political career
Bapat started his public career working initially  with the Rashtriya Swayamsewak Sangh. He was appointed Secretary of Pune City BJP in 1980. He was appointed the Standing Committee Chairman of Pune Municipal Corporation in 1986-87. He was first  elected as Member of Maharashtra Legislative Assembly in 1995. In 1997, he was appointed the Director of Krishna valley development corporation. In 2019 General elections, he was elected to the Lok Sabha from Pune constituency  .

Positions held

Within BJP
 Secretary, BJYM Pune (1980)
 President, BJP Pune (2006)

Legislative
Member, Maharashtra Legislative Assembly - consecutive 5 Terms since 1995
 Chairman, Pune Municipal Corporation Standing Committee (1986–87)

Controversies 
He was sometimes criticised for slip of tongue.

References

Politicians from Pune
Living people
Mayors of Pune
Maharashtra MLAs 1995–1999
Maharashtra MLAs 1999–2004
Maharashtra MLAs 2004–2009
Maharashtra MLAs 2009–2014
1950 births
Savitribai Phule Pune University alumni
Maharashtra MLAs 2014–2019
Bharatiya Janata Party politicians from Maharashtra
Marathi politicians
India MPs 2019–present